Jean-Étienne Antoinette (born 29 January 1966) is a French Guianan politician. He was a former member of the Senate of France. He is the mayor of Kourou, French Guinea.

External links
Page at the French Senate

1966 births
Living people
French Guianan politicians
French Senators of the Fifth Republic
French people of French Guianan descent
Mayors of places in French Guiana
People from Kourou
Senators of French Guiana